Guido von Usedom (October 2, 1854February 24, 1925) was a German admiral that served in the Boxer Rebellion and World War I. His most notable service was in the Dardanelles Campaign.

Biography

Early Years

Guido came from the Pomeranian noble family Usedom and was the son of Lieutenant Kuno von Usedom (1804–1855). He joined the Imperial German Navy on May 31, 1871. After his training and his first tours of duty on board, he was given his first command. For a time he served as adjutant to Prince Henry of Prussia.

In October 1895, Usedom, with the rank of Korvettenkapitän (Lieutenant Commander), was in command of the aviso (dispatch vessel) SMS Pfeil until the end of the year, and from March 1896 he was in command of the aviso SMS Jagd for six months. From September 1896 to July 1898 he was in command of the coastal defence ship SMS Hagen and was made a Senior Korvettenkapitän during this time. He then took command of the large cruiser SMS Hertha, which had just been put into service, on which he was promoted to the new rank of Fregattenkapitän (Commander). He was eventually promoted to the rank of Kapitän zur See (Captain) on September 18, 1899.

The Boxer Rebellion

Usedom was deployed with Hertha in the Mediterranean and East Asia. At the beginning of the Boxer Rebellion, the commander of the East Asia Squadron, Vice Admiral Felix von Bendemann, ordered a landing corps to be formed from the crews of all German cruisers to help protect the European embassies in Beijing. Usedom became the leader of the entire German expeditionary force of around 500 men, which was subordinate to the British commander of the foreign armed forces involved, Vice Admiral Edward Seymour. Usedom simultaneously served as its Chief of Staff.

On June 10, 1900, the entire expeditionary force left Tanggu by rail for Beijing. The advance was stopped by Chinese troops and insurgents, so that the expeditionary force had to withdraw by land. The commander of the British landing corps, Captain John Jellicoe , who later became the commander of the Grand Fleet in the Battle of Jutland, was wounded. In this distressed situation, Seymour requested the use of the German troops under Usedom and is said to have spoken the historical phrase "The Germans to the Front".

Due to his experience with the landing corps, Usedom was released from the leadership of Hertha in September 1900 and assigned to the staff of the commander-in-chief of the allied troops in China, which enforced the end of the uprising. Parallel to this task, he had already been formally appointed as wing adjutant to the emperor on July 21, 1900. On April 5, 1902, Usedom was awarded the Pour le Mérite for his achievements in China.

Before the First World War

In August 1902, Usedom took command of the imperial yacht SMY Hohenzollern, which he held until October 1904. He then became Inspector of the I. Marine Inspection and in this capacity was promoted to Rear Admiral on March 14, 1905. At the same time he was from September 1905 the deputy director, and from January 1906 director, of the Imperial Shipyard Kiel. On August 21, 1908 he was promoted to Vice Admiral and with his retirement at the end of 1910 was given the character of Admiral.

Head of the Sonderkommando Turkey during World War I

In August 1914, with the outbreak of World War I, Usedom was reactivated and sent to Constantinople as head of the Special Command Turkey. Because of increasing signs for a Triple Entente operation against the Dardanelles, and thus the risk of a siege and eventually fall of the capital of the Ottoman Empire, increased Usedom was seconded to the Ottoman Navy. Given the rank of Mushir; he was appointed Commander-in-Chief of the Straits.

Having extremely limited resources, Usedom expanded his coastal positions while having inadequate garrisons in the forts further inland. By mid-February 1915, Usedom managed to man the heavy artillery in the most important forts along the straits and to lay extensive minefields in the straits. The French battleship Bouvet and the British battleships Irresistible and Ocean were sunk by these mines in the course of the Dardanelles campaign.

The further course of the beginning Battle of Gallipoli was determined less by Usedom than by the leadership of the Turkish land forces in form of the German general Otto Liman von Sanders. Usedom as awarded the Oak Leaves to his Pour le Mérite in August 1915, and after the campaign had ended remained in Turkey and in Ottoman service. In January 1916 he also received the substantial promotion to Admiral. He retired on November 26, 1918.

References

Literature
 Dermot Bradley (eds.), Hans H. Hildebrand, Ernest Henriot: Deutschlands Admirale 1849–1945. The military careers of naval, engineering, medical, weapons and administrative officers in the rank of admiral. Band 3: P–Z. Biblio Verlag, Osnabrück 1990, ISBN 3-7648-1700-3, S. 473–475.
 Hans H. Hildebrand, Albert Röhr, Hans-Otto Steinmetz: Die deutschen Kriegsschiffe. Band 3, 1. Auflage, Herford 1981, ISBN 3-7822-0211-2.

1832 births
1904 deaths
German military personnel of the Boxer Rebellion
Ottoman Empire admirals
People from East Prussia
Recipients of the Pour le Mérite (military class)
Imperial German Navy admirals of World War I
Honorary Knights Grand Cross of the Royal Victorian Order